Out There is the fifth studio album by garage rock band The Original Sins, released during the later half of 1992, only a couple of months after their previous release Move. It is the first album by the group to feature drummer Seth Baer.

Track listing

Personnel
John Terlesky - Vocals, guitar, production
Ken Bussiere - Bass
Dan McKinney  - Organ
Seth Baer - Drums
John Keane - Engineering
Eliza Doolittle - Photography

References

External links
 

1992 albums
The Original Sins albums